Michael Nouri (born December 9, 1945) is an American screen and stage actor. He is best known for his television roles, including Dr. Neil Roberts on The O.C., Phil Grey on Damages, Caleb Cortlandt on All My Children, Eli David in NCIS, and Bob Schwartz on Yellowstone. He is also known for his starring roles in the films Flashdance (1983) and The Hidden (1987), and has appeared in several Broadway and Off-Broadway plays, including the original production of Victor/Victoria. He is a Saturn Award and Daytime Emmy Award nominee.

Early life
Nouri was born in Washington D.C. to Gloria (née Montgomery) and Edmond Nouri. Edmond was an Iraqi immigrant from Baghdad who arrived in the United States on a Georgetown University scholarship, enlisted in the U.S. Army during World War II, and became a writer for Stars and Stripes and The New Yorker. 

Nouri grew up in New York City and Alpine, New Jersey. At age 14, after repeatedly getting into fights at school, he was transferred to an all-boys boarding school in Connecticut, Avon Old Farms School, where he became student-body president, and decided to be an actor after starring in a Gilbert and Sullivan play. He attended Rollins College and Emerson College, worked as a waiter, then landed his first role on Broadway in 1967. He was briefly a student under Prem Rawat and was involved in his three-day festival Millennium '73.

Career
After starring in an off-Broadway production of The Crucible, Nouri landed his first Broadway role in Forty Carats, which ran for two years. He made his film debut in 1969, with an uncredited role in Goodbye, Columbus. He appeared on several television soap operas, and was nominated for a Daytime Emmy Award for his role as Steve Kaslow on Search for Tomorrow. He portrayed Lucky Luciano in the miniseries The Gangster Chronicles and its theatrically released feature film Gangster Wars. In 1979, he appeared in the episode "The Curse of Dracula" of the series Cliffhangers.

In 1983, he had a starring role as Nick Hurley in the romantic drama Flashdance. Despite mixed reviews, the film was one of the highest-grossing films of 1983, and was nominated for several top awards, winning an Academy Award for Best Original Song.

Nouri has appeared in numerous television series and television films. He starred opposite Kyle MacLachlan in the horror film The Hidden. He starred on the short-lived series Bay City Blues and Downtown, and on the sitcom Love & War. He starred in the Broadway production of the musical Victor/Victoria as King Marchan, opposite Julie Andrews. He appeared in three separate entries of Law & Order, each time in different roles. He had recurring roles on the series The O.C., Damages, NCIS, and Army Wives. He returned to soap operas with a year-long stint on All My Children. More recently, he had a recurring role on the series Yellowstone for three seasons.

Personal life

Nouri has been married and divorced twice. His first marriage was to Lynn Goldsmith and his second marriage was to Vicki Light. He has two daughters, Hannah and Jennifer. He is an ambassador of the National Multiple Sclerosis Society as a result of one of his ex-wives being affected by the condition.

Filmography

Film

Television

Stage (partial)

Awards and nominations

Daytime Emmy Award

 1976 Daytime Emmy Award for Outstanding Lead Actor in a Drama Series: Search for Tomorrow (nominated)

Saturn Awards

 1988 Saturn Award for Best Actor: The Hidden (nominated)

Sitges Film Festival

 1987 Sitges Film Festival Best Actor: The Hidden (won)

References

External links

 
 
 

1945 births
American male film actors
American male musical theatre actors
American male soap opera actors
American male television actors
American people of Iraqi descent
Emerson College alumni
Living people
Male actors from Washington, D.C.
Rollins College alumni
American artists of Arab descent
Avon Old Farms alumni